Kkokdugaksi Noreum is a type of traditional puppet play from Korea. It was developed in 18th century Joseon Dynasty era by Namsadang troupe which is a group of traveler artists. Namsadang traveled all over Korea and entertained the commoners.

Usually the puppet play marked the end of the entertainment performed by Namsadang artists. Kkoktugakshi is divided into episodes and unrelated to each other. The central character of the play is Bak Cheomji. He acts as narrator and tells about his life. The Kkoktugakshi Nori mainly tells the story related with social life of common people. It concerns the story about an apostate Buddhist monk, polygamy, and the badly treated lower classes under the yangban system.

See also
Talchum
Namsadang

References

Korean art
Puppets